Horwood is a village and former civil parish in North Devon district, in the county of Devon, England, situated about 4 miles east of the town of Bideford. It is now in the civil parish of Horwood, Lovacott and Newton Tracey. In 1961 the civil parish had a population of 79.

The parish church of St Michael is Grade I listed.

References

External links

Villages in Devon
Former civil parishes in Devon
North Devon